Ely Reeves Callaway Jr. (1919-2001) was an American businessman. He founded the Callaway Golf Company in 1982.

Early life
Ely Callaway was born in 1919 and raised in LaGrange, Georgia and earned a degree from Emory University.

At age 10 he earned $150 selling copies of Literary Digest, and used his profits to buy a J.H. Hale peach tree that yielded a crop of $750 in its first year.

Ely Callaway played golf as a youth, and was a distant cousin of golf legend Bobby Jones. He won four successive championships at LaGrange’s Highland Country Club. He was business manager of his high school newspaper and yearbook. His family wanted him to be an engineer, but he was determined to obtain a liberal arts degree. At Emory, he was senior class president while working as the business manager for the university publication called The Campus. He was a 1937 initiate of the Epsilon Chapter of Kappa Alpha Order and was a member of the Omicron Delta Kappa leadership fraternity. He graduated with a degree in history in 1940.

Army career
He joined the Army as a reserve officer in 1940 and earned a reserve officer’s commission through a correspondence course. Despite his intent to stay away from the family business of textiles, he was assigned to the Philadelphia Centralized Procurement Agency; the Army decided fabrics suited him after learning of his family’s history in textiles and Callaway Mills. He fulfilled his one-year obligation in October 1941, and decided to re-enlist. Just a few months later, Pearl Harbor was bombed, and his role and responsibilities expanded exponentially. "All of a sudden we were buying hundreds of millions of items of apparel and all of the fabrics," he said. "[By 1945,] we had about twenty-five thousand people working there administering contracts all over the United States. I was spending at the rate of something like $700 million a year under just my jurisdiction, with my name on every contract. So you learn business real quick," he told Emory Magazine.

He rose to the rank of major and married; at just 24 years old, he became the youngest major in the Philadelphia Quartermaster Depot. His three children, Reeves, Lisa and Nicholas, were born in the 1940s and 50s and when Ely Callaway was discharged from the Army, he had several job offers and contacts in the textiles industry. He went to work for Deering-Milliken Co. in Atlanta. Charming and charismatic, he was chosen to launch a new company division in New York and became a rising corporate star. One of his greatest professional successes in the textiles business came from his development of polyester blends. "I was one of the leaders of the move toward the fundamental new fabrics, Dacron blended first with wool and then with cotton," he told Emory Magazine. "It started at Milliken and increased tremendously at Burlington. My first real success was a blend of wool and Dacron, which went into men's suitings and became very famous. It led the way for all the other fabrics to be adopted as blends instead of 100 percent."

Textiles
Ely Callaway used unique and sometimes shocking marketing techniques, like dousing a line of models in suits with water to show the fabrics’ innovative properties, while also garnering attention from media. He was also among the first to hire a woman for an executive position. Letitia Baldrige, etiquette author, columnist, and former social secretary and chief of staff for Jacqueline Kennedy, was Burlington’s first director of consumer affairs.

In the late 1950s, Textron hired Ely Callaway away from Deering-Milliken; Textron was then sold to Burlington Industries. He became vice president at Burlington in 1960, then president and director by 1968. But when he was passed over for the top spot as chairman of the company, he retired in 1973, and headed west to launch his next career.

Wine and golf
Ely Callaway purchased 140 acres of land in Temecula, California and decided to turn it into a vineyard. Some people said the area was unsuitable for growing grapes, but Ely Callaway hired soils and climate experts who determined that the Temecula area had a microclimate that indeed was suitable for grape growing. He planted his grapes in 1973 and established Callaway Winery and Vineyards in 1974. The first wines were sold in 1975, and Callaway Riesling was served at a luncheon for Queen Elizabeth II in New York; the Queen asked for two glasses and a meeting with the vintner, and soon Temecula began to earn a reputation as a legitimate wine-producing region.

In 1981, Callaway Winery and Vineyard was purchased by Hiram Walker and Sons for $14 million, leaving Ely Callaway with a $9 million profit. Retired for a second time, he was playing golf when he discovered Hickory Sticks clubs in a Palm Springs-area golf shop. The old fashioned-looking, wooden clubs looked similar to those he had played with as a youth. However, these clubs were unique; they had a hollowed wooden shaft that was filled with a steel rod for strength and consistency. Hickory Stick, then owned by Richard Parente, Dick De La Cruz and Tony Manzoni, was looking for investors, and Ely Callaway was looking for a third career. In 1982, he purchased half ownership of Hickory Stick USA for $400,000. It soon became Callaway Hickory Stick USA, and by 1984 Ely Callaway purchased the company in full, becoming Callaway Golf – his third and most successful business venture.

Ely Callaway was awarded an Emory Medal in 1990 and an honorary doctor of humane letters degree in 1996. According to a 1994 profile in Golf Digest, "In his sixty-plus years in business, Callaway's reputation for honesty, ethics, and generosity is unblemished."

Ely Callaway was chairman of the National UNCF Corporate Campaign. He donated generously to Emory University, as well as the local community near Carlsbad, California and the Callaway Golf Foundation.

Later life
In April 2001, at age 82, Ely Callaway was diagnosed with inoperable pancreatic cancer. Until that time, he had arrived early at his Carlsbad office nearly every day—unless he was traveling for business—driving himself to and from work, actively and aggressively engaged in the business of selling what he called “Demonstrably Superior and Pleasingly Different” golf clubs. Just a few months after his cancer diagnosis in 2001, Ely Callaway died. The headstone on the Callaway family plot in LaGrange, Georgia, states: "He considered himself very fortunate in all aspects of his life".

References

External links
Ely Callaway hit it big with textiles and wine. Now it’s golf. But the maker of the world's best-selling club says it’s time to retire and write his life story. How can he possibly slow down? article by Paul Dean on Los Angeles Times, July 17, 1994

2001 deaths
American manufacturing businesspeople
People from Temecula, California
1919 births
Callaway family
People from LaGrange, Georgia